Norman Zezula (born 8 June 1999) is a Polish sprint canoeist.

He competed at the 2021 ICF Canoe Sprint World Championships, winning a silver medal in the C-4 500 m distance.

References

External links

1999 births
Living people
Polish male canoeists
ICF Canoe Sprint World Championships medalists in Canadian